Asura catameces is a moth of the  family Erebidae. It is found in Australia.

References

catameces
Moths described in 1940
Moths of Australia